Sincan railway station is a railway station in Sincan, Ankara and the western terminus of the Başkentray commuter rail line. Prior to the closure of all non-YHT trains within Ankara, the station was an intercity and regional rail station. Between 2009 and 2018, Sincan also served high-speed trains. On 10 January 2018, high-speed YHT trains bypassed Sincan stopping at Lale station instead, until 15 March 2018 and subsequently at Eryaman YHT railway station.

Railway stations in Ankara Province